Marienlyst halt is a railway halt serving the district Marienlyst in the northern outskirts of the city of Helsingør, Denmark, near Marienlyst Castle and Hotel Marienlyst.

The station is located on the Hornbæk Line from Helsingør to Gilleleje. The train services are currently operated by the railway company Lokaltog which runs frequent local train services between Helsingør station and Gilleleje station.

See also
 List of railway stations in Denmark

External links

Lokaltog

Railway stations in the Capital Region of Denmark
Helsingør
Buildings and structures in Helsingør Municipality